Chureh Nab (also Romanized as Chūreh Nāb, Chooreh Nab, and Chowreh Nāb; also known as Charahnāb, Chirano, Chowrnāb, Chūreh Tāb, and Jūreh Nāb) is a village in Bonab Rural District, in the Central District of Zanjan County, Zanjan Province, Iran. At the 2006 census, its population was 187, in 39 families.

References 

Populated places in Zanjan County